Wyfak Riyadhi M'Sila, known as WR M'Sila or simply WRM for short, is an Algerian football club based in M'Sila. The club was founded in 1937  and its colours are yellow and red. Their home stadium, Stade Chahid Khalfa Ahmed, has a capacity of 5,000 spectators. The club is currently playing in the Algerian Ligue 2.

History
The club came third in the 2009–10 Ligue Inter-Régions de football – Groupe Centre.

The club was promoted for the 2010–11 season of the newly created Championnat National de Football Amateur due to the professionalisation of the first two divisions in Algeria.

On August 5, 2020, WR M'Sila promoted to the Algerian Ligue 2.

References

External links

Football clubs in Algeria
WR M'Sila
Association football clubs established in 1937
1937 establishments in Algeria
Sports clubs in Algeria